Odin is both a surname and a given name. Notable people with the name include:

Surname
Cécile Odin (born 1965), French cyclist
Jaishree Odin (born 1952), academic at the University of Hawaii
Jean Odin (1889–1975), French politician
Jean-Marie Odin (1807–1870), French Roman Catholic missionary, first Bishop of Galveston, and second Archbishop of New Orleans

Given name
Odin Langen (1913–1976), American politician and U.S. Representative from Minnesota

Scandinavian masculine given names
Danish masculine given names
Norwegian masculine given names
Swedish masculine given names
English masculine given names